Timi Jan (also Romanized as Tīmī Jān; also known as Tīmjān) is a village in Khorram Rud Rural District, in the Central District of Tuyserkan County, Hamadan Province, Iran. At the 2006 census, its population was 291, in 79 families.

References 

Populated places in Tuyserkan County